The Swimming River is an estuary and the name of the Navesink River upstream of Red Bank in Colts Neck Township and Middletown Township, located in Monmouth County, New Jersey in the United States.

The Swimming River headwaters upstream of Swimming River Road have been dammed to form the Swimming River Reservoir.

See also
List of rivers of New Jersey

References

External links
U.S. Geological Survey: NJ stream gaging stations

Rivers of Monmouth County, New Jersey
Rivers of New Jersey